Chang Won-jun (Hangul: 장원준, Hanja: 張元準; born July 31, 1985) is a South Korean pitcher for the Doosan Bears of the KBO League.

Professional career
He joined the Lotte Giants in the first draft in 2004, and played for the team between 2004 and 2014. On November 26, 2014, he declared it to be in the free agent market on the expiration of its preferential negotiation. After that, he signed an agreement with the Doosan Bears on November 29, 2014.

International career
Chang represented South Korea at the 2017 World Baseball Classic.

References

External links 
Career statistics and player information from the KBO League

1985 births
Living people
Baseball players from Seoul
KBO League pitchers
Lotte Giants players
Doosan Bears players
South Korean baseball players
2013 World Baseball Classic players
2015 WBSC Premier12 players
2017 World Baseball Classic players